The word States-General, or Estates-General, may refer to:

Currently in use
 Estates-General on the Situation and Future of the French Language in Quebec, the name of a commission set up by the government of Quebec on June 29, 2000
 States General of the Netherlands (Staten-Generaal) is the bicameral parliament of present-day Netherlands. It evolved from the pre-democratic government of the Seventeen Provinces, out of which the Dutch Republic (officially named United Provinces) emerged.
 
Historically
 Estates General (France) (before 1789) 
 Estates-General of 1789 (France)
 States-General of the Batavian Republic (Dutch republic immediately prior to the French Revolution)
 Estates General of French Canada (1967–69)
 Junta de Braços (States-General of Catalonia), a consultative body of the Generalitat of Catalonia during the early modern age.

See also
The Estates
Estates of the realm
Parliament of Scotland